Mongolia has diplomatic relations with 191 UN states, the Holy See, the State of Palestine and the European Union.

It seeks neutrality and cordial relations with many countries including in cultural and economic matters. It has a modest number of missions abroad.

Diplomatic relations

As of 2021, Mongolia has diplomatic relations with all United Nations members except Botswana:

Africa

Americas

East Asia

South East Asia

South Asia

Russia, Central Asia and West Asia

Europe
Mongolia seeks closer relations with countries in Europe and hopes to receive most-favoured-nation status from the European Union (EU). During 1991, Mongolia signed investment promotion and protection agreements with Germany and France and an economic cooperation agreement with the United Kingdom. Germany continued former East German cooperative programs and also provided loans and aid.

Oceania

International organisation participation
AsDB, ASEAN (observer), ASEM, ESCAP, FAO, G-77, IAEA, IBRD, ICAO, ICCt, ICFTU, ICRM, IDA, IFAD, IFC, IFRCS, ILO, IMF, IMO, Intelsat, Interpol, IOC, ISO, ITU, NAM, OPCW, UN, UNCTAD, UNESCO, UNIDO, UPU, WCO, WHO, WIPO, WMO, WToO, WTrO, SCO (observer)

Mongolia did not join the UN until 1961 because of repeated threats to veto by the Republic of China, which considered Mongolia to be part of its territory (see China and the United Nations).

See also
 List of diplomatic missions in Mongolia
 List of diplomatic missions of Mongolia
 Visa requirements for Mongolian citizens

References

External links
 Ministry of Foreign Affairs
Permanent Mission of Mongolia to the United Nations
List of countries with established diplomatic relations 

 
Politics of Mongolia